Sorbhog Assembly constituency' is one of the 126 assembly constituencies of  Assam a north east state of India. Sorbhog is also part of Kokrajhar Lok Sabha constituency.

Members of Legislative Assembly

 1951: Akshoy Kumar Das, Indian National Congress
 1957: Ghaneshyam Talukdar, Independent
 1962: Akshoy Kumar Das, Indian National Congress
 1967: Pranita Talukdar, Indian National Congress
 1972: Pranita Talukdar, Indian National Congress
 1978: Hemen Das, Communist Party of India (Marxist)
 1983: Hemen Das, Communist Party of India (Marxist)
 1985: Hemen Das, Communist Party of India (Marxist)
 1991: Samsul Hoque, Indian National Congress
 1996: Hemen Das, Communist Party of India (Marxist)
 2001: Samsul Hoque, Independent 
 2006: Uddhab Barman, Communist Party of India (Marxist)
 2011: Ranjit Kumar Das, Bharatiya Janata Party
 2016: Ranjit Kumar Das, Bharatiya Janata Party
 2021: Manoranjan Talukdar, Communist Party of India (Marxist)

Election results

2016 result

2011 result

2006 result

2001 result

See also

 Sorbhog
 List of constituencies of Assam Legislative Assembly

References

External links 
 

Assembly constituencies of Assam
Barpeta district